Drenovets (Bulgarian: Дреновец) is a village in north-western Bulgaria. It is located in the municipality of Ruzhintsi, Vidin Province.

As of December 2013, the village has a population of 1302.

References
 http://www.guide-bulgaria.com/nw/vidin/rujintsi/drenovets

Villages in Vidin Province